Jairani (possibly from Aymara k'ayra frog, -ni a suffix, "the one with a frog (or frogs)") is a mountain in the Vilcanota mountain range in the Andes of Peru, about  high. It is located in the Puno Region, Carabaya Province, Corani District. Jairani lies northeast of the glaciated area of Quelccaya (Quechua for "snow plain").

References 

Mountains of Puno Region
Mountains of Peru